Ruby and the Rednecks is an American Rock and roll band from New York City, inspired by New York Dolls, created by the singer, songwriter, playwright and actress Ruby Lynn Reyner with collaborating musical artists in 1970 and active until today. The band was originally composed by Ruby Lynn Reyner (lead vocals), John Madera (guitar and backing vocal), George Basley (drums), Augie Sabini (saxophone), Bobby Kent (drums),Susan Lampert (keyboard and backing vocal), and Danny Couse (bass guitar), but currently has a  new formation. From the original group, only Reyner and Lampert remain. Ruby wrote most of the lyrics herself. John Madera was praised as a guitar player.

Currently they are mostly playing at Max's Kansas City and CBGB's Reunions.

History
The band formed during glam rock era in the 1970s in New York. They debuted at the Mercer Arts Center opening for New York Dolls, where Patti Smith used to read poetry to open the concerts for Ruby and the Rednecks and other bands such as Teenage Lust and the New York Dolls. Michael Arian said, "Ruby was just extraordinary and was very, very entertaining". Ruby and the Rednecks were one of the staples of the Mercer's scene, appearing on the bill at the New Year's Eve 1972 gig with the Modern Lovers, Suicide, Jayne County, and the New York Dolls. 
In 1973, the building housing the Mercer Arts Center collapsed and Max's Kansas City and CBGB's became the stage for bands like the New York Dolls, Suicide, Television, the Dictators, and the Ramones. Thus the group  became part of the early punk rock movement, and performed on the New York Club circuit during the 1970s with other noted artists including the Ramones, Talking Heads, Blondie, the Patti Smith Group and the New York Dolls.

Ruby and the Rednecks released two albums produced by Peter Crowley and Ruby Lynn Reyner: From the Wrong side of Town and Live Again! At CBGB's

Original members
 Ruby Lynn Reyner – lead vocals
 John Madera – guitar and backing vocal
 George Basley – drums 
 Augie Sabini – saxophone  
 Bobby Kent – drums
 Susan Lampert – keyboard and backing vocal
 Ralph Czitron on bass

Other members
 Steeve Greenfield – saxophones
 Mike Grner – fretless bar guitar
 Ron Salvo – drums
 Emma 'Cha Cha' – channing – backing vocals
 'Wil' Bill Thompson – guitars
 Sonic Uke – ukeleles
 Danny Couse – bass and keyboards
 Mary Rodriguez – drums and bass
 Doug Sako – drums

Discography

Albums
 Live at Mercer Arts Center
 Live at Max's Kansas City
 From the Wrong Side of Town
 Live Again! At CBGB's

Compilation albums
 Max's Kansas City 1976 & Beyond (2017)
 Rock and Roll Lips: The Best of Ruby and the Rednecks
 Nightclubbing: The Birth of Punk Rock in NYC

References

External links 
 

American glam rock musical groups
Musical groups established in 1970
Musical groups from New York City